Aleksandr Aleksandrovich Gaidukov (born January 25, 1979) is a former Russian professional footballer. He made his debut in the Russian Premier League in 2000 for FC Rotor Volgograd.

References

Russian footballers
FC Rotor Volgograd players
1979 births
Living people
Russian Premier League players
FC Mordovia Saransk players
FC Energiya Volzhsky players

Association football midfielders